Carl Enow Ngachu (born 21 February 1975) is a Cameroonian football manager.

Career
Enow was the head coach of the Cameroon women's national team at the 2012 Summer Olympics and 2015 FIFA Women's World Cup.

References

External links
 
 
 Profile 1 and profile 2 at Soccerdonna.de 

1975 births
Living people
People from Southwest Region (Cameroon)
Cameroonian football managers
Women's association football managers
Cameroon women's national football team managers
2015 FIFA Women's World Cup managers